John Thomas Gordy, Jr. (July 17, 1935 – January 30, 2009) was an American football player for 11 years from 1957 to 1967. Hew was an offensive guard for the Detroit Lions.

Early life and education
Gordy played his final season of high school football at lineman for the former Isaac Litton High School in the Inglewood neighborhood of Nashville, Tennessee. He was named second-team all-Nashville Interscholastic League and honorable mention All-State. 

Gordy subsequently played college football at the University of Tennessee. While at the University of Tennessee, he was a member of the Lambda Chi Alpha fraternity. In his senior season, he served as captain of the Vols.  In 2018, he was voted one of the 10 greatest players from the Nashville area ever to have played UT football by a panel of sportswriters.  He was a teammate of Johnny Majors, who served as his alternate captain (and went on to become a legendary coach at the University of Pittsburgh and at Tennessee).  The 1956 Vols won the championship of the Southeastern Conference.

Career

National Football League
Gordy was drafted in the second round of the 1957 NFL Draft by the Lions.  The 1957 Lions, quarterbacked primarily by Tobin Rote and with Gordy playing a key role in the blocking schemes, won the NFL championship, the last Lions team to do so (as of 2022).  He played in three Pro Bowls during his professional career.

Gordy served as president and executive director of the professional football players union, the National Football League Players Association. As such, he was, in 1969, a key negotiator of the first collective bargaining agreement in major professional sports.  Shortly after its ratification, he was forced to retire from the NFL due to a lingering knee injury.

Post NFL career
"Participatory journalist" George Plimpton stated that Gordy was the inspiration for his second book (of three) about professional American football, Mad Ducks and Bears.  Plimpton initially met Gordy in 1960 while doing early research for what would become his first pro football book, Paper Lion, and was told by Gordy that in his opinion there was an obvious wide market for a book about football line play, consisting of young men and boys currently playing those positions and older men who had done so in the past, together forming a potential readership of millions.  Gordy, whose football nickname was "Bear" due to his hirsuteness, was able to interest his erstwhile training camp roommate, Alex Karras ("Mad Duck") in the project as well, although the book was not published until 13 years after this initial meeting. Rather than being the technical work about methods and techniques that Gordy had originally envisioned, it is instead primarily a collection of humorous anecdotes and vignettes, with only minimal attention paid to technical aspects of football.

Around 1970, Gordy became President of Visual Sounds, Inc., the audio-visual subsidiary of A & R Recording in Manhattan.

Gordy became the California state director of Fellowship of Christian Athletes in 1999.  At that time, there were only a handful of public high schools that were participating with FCA.  By the time John died, nearly every single high school in Southern California had an FCA group on their campus. Gordy considered this his greatest accomplishment.

Gordy died on January 30, 2009, in Orange, California, after a lengthy battle with cancer.

Personal life
Gordy was married three times. He first married – on June 2, 1957, in Nashville – Yvonne Hodge. He again married – on July 1, 1972 in Blue Hill, Maine – Jean Becton DeMeritt (née Jean Sprague Becton) (also her second marriage), a 1965 graduate of Vassar College and granddaughter of Maxwell Becton, co-founder of Becton Dickinson, a multinational medical device manufacturer. Jean and John Gordy divorced December 29, 1982, in Santa Barbara County, California. John Gordy married again to Betty Euelene Epperson (maiden).

Gordy's father, Poppa John Gordy (né John Thomas Gordy; 1904–1961), a dixieland jazz, swing, ragtime, and honky-tonk pianist, was for more than 25 years, musical director of The Noon Show on station WSM, the NBC Radio Network affiliate in Nashville.

Bibliography

Notes

References

 

  

 

 
 
 

 

  ;  (US Newsstream database).

External links

 
 
 

1935 births
2009 deaths
American football offensive guards
Executive Directors of the National Football League Players Association
Detroit Lions players
Nebraska Cornhuskers football coaches
Tennessee Volunteers football players
Western Conference Pro Bowl players
People from Nashville, Tennessee
Deaths from cancer in California
Trade unionists from Tennessee
Presidents of the National Football League Players Association
Burials at Pacific View Memorial Park